Heemskerk is a municipality and a town in the Netherlands, in the province of North Holland. 

It is also a Dutch toponymic surname referring to this town:
Heemskerk
Femke Heemskerk (born 1987), Dutch swimmer
Fenny Heemskerk (1919–2007), Dutch chess master
Frank Heemskerk (born 1969), Dutch politician
Jan Heemskerk (1810–1897), Dutch politician
Marianne Heemskerk (born 1944), Dutch swimmer
Theo Heemskerk (1852–1932), Dutch politician and prime minister
Van Heemskerck/Van Heemskerk
:de:Coenraad van Heemskerck (1646–1702), Dutch diplomat and politician
Egbert van Heemskerck I (1634–1704), Dutch painter 
 Egbert van Heemskerck II ( – 1744), Dutch painter
Jacob van Heemskerk (1567–1607), Dutch explorer
HNLMS Jacob van Heemskerk, light cruiser of the Royal Netherlands Navy
Jacoba van Heemskerck (1876–1923), Dutch painter
Johan van Heemskerk (1597–1656), Dutch poet
Maarten van Heemskerck (1499–1574), Dutch painter

Heemskerck 

 Heemskerck was Abel Tasman's flagship on his 1642 voyage of discovery

Dutch-language surnames